Climate change adaptation is the process of adjusting to current or expected effects of climate change. For humans, adaptation aims to moderate or avoid harm, and exploit opportunities; for natural systems, humans may intervene to help the adjustment. Adaptation actions can be either incremental (actions where the central aim is to maintain the essence and integrity of a system) or transformative (actions that change the fundamental attributes of a system in response to climate change and its impacts). The need for adaptation varies from place to place, depending on the risk to human or ecological systems. Adaptation actions can be grouped into four categories:  Infrastructural and technological; institutional; behavioural and cultural; and nature-based options.

Adaptation is especially important in developing countries since those countries are most vulnerable to climate change and are bearing the brunt of the effects of climate change. Human adaptive capacity is unevenly distributed across different regions and populations, and developing countries generally have less capacity to adapt. Adaptive capacity is closely linked to social and economic development. 

In general higher levels of development mean higher adaptive capacity, but some development locks people into certain patterns or behaviours. And the most developed areas may have low adaptation capacity to new types of natural hazards, not previously experienced, relative to more familiar natural hazards. The economic costs of adaptation to climate change are likely to cost billions of dollars annually for the next several decades.

Definition 
Climate change adaptation is defined as:

 "In human systems, as the process of adjustment to actual or expected climate and its effects in order to moderate harm or take advantage of beneficial opportunities." 
 "In natural systems, adaptation is the process of adjustment to actual climate and its effects; human intervention may facilitate this."

Understanding the need

Climate change impacts research 

The scientific framing of climate change adaptation generally starts with analyses of the likely effects of climate change on the people, ecosystems and environment. These impacts concern the effects on lives, livelihoods, health and well-being, ecosystems and species, economic, social and cultural assets, and infrastructure.  Impacts may include changed agricultural yields, increased floods, and droughts or coral reef bleaching. Analysis of such impacts is an important step in understanding current and future adaptation needs and options.

As of 2022, the level of warming is 1.2°C (2.2°F), and is on track to increase to 2.5 to 2.9°C (4.5 to 5.2°F) by the end of the century. This is causing a variety of secondary effects.

Many adverse effects of climate change are not changes in the average conditions, but changes in the variation or the extremes of conditions. For example, the average sea level in a port might not be as important as the height of water during a storm surge (which causes flooding); the average rainfall in an area might not be as important as how frequent and severe droughts and extreme precipitation events become.

Disaster risks, response and preparedness 

Because climate change is one contributor to disaster risk, climate change adaptation is sometimes seen as one of many processes within disaster risk reduction. In turn, disaster risk reduction should sit within sustainable development to avoid isolation from topics wider than disaster risk.

Disasters are often triggered by natural hazards but are always linked to human action (or inaction) or rooted in anthropogenic processes. Disasters, economic loss and the underlying vulnerabilities that drive risk are increasing, and global risks like climate change are having major impacts in every locality. As climate change is projected to increase the frequency and severity of extreme weather events and disasters, adaptation may also include measures towards increased preparedness and relevant disaster response capacities.

Aims 
For humans, adaptation aims to moderate or avoid harm, and exploit opportunities; for natural systems, humans may intervene to help adjustment.

Policy aims 
The Paris Agreement of 2015 requires countries to keep global temperature rise this century to less than 2°C above pre-industrial levels, and to pursue efforts to limit the temperature increase to 1.5°C. Even if greenhouse gas emissions are stopped relatively soon, global warming and its effects will last many years due to the inertia of the climate system, so both carbon neutrality ("net zero") and adaptation are necessary.

The Global Goal on Adaptation was also established under the Paris Agreement. It focuses on supporting long-term adaptation goals of parties and funding support for most vulnerable countries’ adaptation needs in the context of the 1.5/2°C goal. It features three core components: reducing vulnerability to climate change, enhancing adaptive capacity, and strengthening resilience.

Reduce risk factors: vulnerability and exposure 

Adaptation can help decrease climate risk via the three interacting risk factors: hazards, vulnerability and exposure. It is not possible to directly reduce hazards (hazards are affected by current and future changes in climate). Instead, adaptation addresses risks of climate impacts from the interactions among climate-related hazards, and the exposure and vulnerability of affected human and ecological systems. Exposure refers to the presence of people, livelihoods, ecosystems, other assets etc. in places that could be negatively affected. Exposure can be decreased by retreating from areas with high climate risks, such as floodplains and by improving systems for early warnings and evacuations. Climate change vulnerability is 'the propensity or predisposition to be adversely affected' by climate change. It can apply to humans but also to natural systems (ecosystems). Human and ecosystem vulnerability are interdependent. Climate change vulnerability encompasses "a variety of concepts and elements, including sensitivity or susceptibility to harm and lack of capacity to cope and adapt". Vulnerability can be decreased in urban settings through using green garden spaces to reduce heat stress and food insecurity for low-income neighbourhoods.

Vulnerability to climate hazards may be reduced with the help of ecosystem-based adaptation. For instance, flooding may be prevented if mangroves have the ability to dampen storm energy. As such, protection of the mangrove ecosystem can be a form of adaptation. Insurance and livelihood diversification increase resilience and decrease vulnerability. Further actions to decrease vulnerability include strengthening social protection and building infrastructure more resistant to hazards.

Increase adaptive capacity 

Adaptive capacity in the context of climate change is the ability of a system (human, natural or managed) to adjust to climate change (including climate variability and extremes) to moderate potential damages, to take advantage of opportunities, or to cope with consequences. As a property, adaptive capacity is distinct from adaptation itself. In practical terms, adaptive capacity is the ability to design and implement effective adaptation strategies, or to react to evolving hazards and stresses so as to reduce the likelihood of negative impacts of climate-related hazards.

Those societies that can respond to change quickly and successfully have a high adaptive capacity. Conversely, high adaptive capacity does not necessarily translate into successful adaptation action or succeed in goals of equity and enhancing well-being. For example, adaptive capacity in Western Europe is generally considered to be high, and the risks of warmer winters increasing the range of livestock diseases is well documented, but many parts of Europe were still badly affected by outbreaks of bluetongue virus in livestock in 2007.

By some indices such as ND-GAIN high-income countries tend to have higher adaptive capacity. However, there is strong variation within countries.

The determinants of adaptive capacity include:
 Economic resources: Wealthier nations are better able to bear the costs of adaptation to climate change than poorer ones.
 Technology: Lack of technology can impede adaptation.
 Information and skills: Information and trained personnel are required to assess and implement successful adaptation options.
 Social infrastructure
 Institutions: Nations with well-developed social institutions are believed to have greater adaptive capacity than those with less effective institutions, typically developing nations and economies in transition.
 Equity: Some believe that adaptive capacity is greater where there are government institutions and arrangements in place that allow equitable access to resources.
In many instances, measures to promote sustainable development overlap with those for adaptive capacity, and both types of activity can reduce climate risk while also yielding development benefits.  These activities can include: Improving access to resources, reducing poverty, lowering inequities of resources and wealth among groups, improving education and information, improving infrastructure, improving institutional capacity and efficiency, promoting local indigenous practices, knowledge, and experiences.

Strengthening resilience 

Climate resilience is considered to be “the capacity of social, economic and ecosystems to cope with a hazardous event or trend or disturbance” and includes the abilities to reorganise and learn. This definition is similar to that of climate change adaptation. However resilience is aligned with a more systems-based approach to absorbing change, and utilizing those changes to develop into more efficient configurations. The idea is that actors can intervene to reorganise the system when disturbance creates an opportunity to do so. They could guide the reorganisation in more desirable directions (such as towards social or development goals).

Implemented adaptation most often builds upon resilience as a way of bouncing back to recover after a disturbance, and is considered to be incremental as opposed to transformational. On the other hand, climate resilience-focused projects can be seen as activities to promote and support transformational adaptation, since transformational adaptation is connected with implementation at scale and ideally at the system-level.

Strengthening resilience is therefore important for maintaining a capacity for transformation. Transformations, and the processes of transition, have been mapped by considering the major systems/sectors at scale: energy, land and ecosystems, urban and infrastructure, industrial and societal. It is thought that transformations may fail if they do not also integrate social justice, consider power differences and political inclusion, and if they do not deliver improvements in incomes and wellbeing for everyone.

Climate resilient development is a closely related area of work and research topic that has recently emerged. It describes situations in which adaptation, mitigation and development solutions are pursued together. It is able to benefit from synergies from among the actions and reduce trade-offs.

Co-benefits with mitigation 

Strategies to limit climate change are complementary to efforts to adapt to it. Limiting warming, by reducing greenhouse gas emissions and removing them from the atmosphere, is also known as climate change mitigation.  

There are some synergies (co-benefits) between adaptation and mitigation. Synergies include the benefits of public transport for both mitigation and adaptation. Public transport has lower greenhouse gas emissions per kilometer travelled than cars. A good public transport network also increases resilience in case of disasters: evacuation and emergency access becomes easier. Reduced air pollution from public transport improves health, which in turn may lead to improved economic resilience, as healthy workers perform better.

Options by type of action 
Many adaptation responses (also known as adaptation measures, strategies or solutions) exist and are used to help manage impacts and risks to people and nature.

Current adaptation tends to focus on near-term climate risks and is focused on particular sectors, such as water and agriculture, and regions, such as Africa and Asia. It is important to close existing gaps between actually implemented adaptation and the current needs (relative to today's climate) for reducing risks to a tolerable level. However, future adaptation also has to anticipate future risks of climate change. The effectiveness of some options may decrease with increasing global warming or they may become entirely unfeasible.

Adaptation responses can be grouped into four categories that all directly aim at reducing risks and exploiting opportunities:

 Infrastructural and technological adaptation (including engineering, built environment, and high tech solutions);
 Institutional adaptation (economic organizations, laws and regulation, government policies and programs).
 Behavioural and cultural (individual and household strategies as well as social and community approaches);
 Nature-based solutions (including ecosystem-based adaptation options)
Another way of grouping the options is in three categories: Structural and physical adaptation (this can be grouped into engineering and built environment, technological, ecosystem-based, services); Social adaptation (educational, informational, behavioral); and Institutional adaptation (economic organizations, laws and regulation, government policies and programs).

Different types of adaptation have been distinguished, including anticipatory versus reactive, autonomous versus planned and incremental versus transformational adaptation. 

 Incremental adaptation actions have the central aim to maintain the essence and integrity of a system; transformative actions are actions that change the fundamental attributes of a system in response to climate change and its impacts.
 Autonomous adaptation is adaptation in response to experienced climate and its effects, without planning explicitly or consciously focused on addressing climate change. Planned adaptation can be reactive or anticipatory, i.e., undertaken before impacts are apparent. Relying on autonomous adaptation to climate change can result in substantial costs that could largely be avoided with planned adaptation.

Infrastructural and technological options

Built environment 

Options that fall into the group of "built environment" include for example installing or upgrading infrastructure to protect against flooding, sea level rise, heatwaves and extreme heat, as well as infrastructure to respond to changed rainfall patterns in agriculture (e.g. irrigation infrastructure). These are explained further in the section below "by type of climate change impact".

Early warning systems

Climate services 
Climate services are systems for the delivery of the best available climate information to end-users in the most usable and accessible formats. Their objective is to support adaptation, mitigation and risk management decisions. A vast diversity of practices and products have been developed for the interpretation, analysis, and communication of climate data. They often combine different sources and different types of knowledge. Their aim is to fulfill a well-specified need. These climate services mark a shift from supply-driven (i.e. science-driven) information products to a demand-driven (i.e. decision-driven) production system that takes greater account of users’ needs. To do so they require different types of user–producer engagement, or co-design, depending on what the service aims to deliver.

Climate services are varied in their structure and objectives. They are set up to help users cope with current climate variability and limit the damage caused by climate-related disasters or be an important measure to reduce risks in a particular sector. Examples include: Copernicus Climate Change Service (C3S) which provides free and open access to climate data, tools and information which are used for a variety of purposes. Participatory Integrated Climate Services for Agriculture (PICSA) which is a participatory approach which combines historical climate data and forecasts with farmers’ local contextual knowledge.

Institutional options 

Institutional responses include zoning regulations, new building codes, new insurance schemes, and coordination mechanisms.

Policies have been identified as important tools for integrating issues of climate change adaptation. At national levels, adaptation strategies may be found in National Action Plans (NAPS ) and National Adaptation Programme of Action (NAPA, in developing countries), and/or in national policies and strategies on climate change. These are at different levels of development in different countries and in cities (progress is discussed in the section below "implementation").

Cities, states, and provinces often have considerable responsibility in land use planning, public health, and disaster management. Institutional adaptations are more frequently reported in cities than in other sectors. Some have begun to take steps to adapt to threats intensified by climate change, such as flooding, bushfires, heatwaves, and rising sea levels.

Building codes 
Managing the codes or regulations that buildings must conform to is important for keeping people healthy and comfortable during extremes of hot and cold as well as protecting them from floods. There are many examples for achieving this, such as increasing the insulation values, adding solar shading, increasing natural ventilation or passive cooling, codes for green roofs to reduce urban heat island effects or requiring waterfront properties to have higher foundations. Land use zoning controls are also central to investment in urban development and reducing risks related to the areas threatened by floods and landslides.

Insurance 

Insurance spreads the financial impact of flooding and other extreme weather events. There is an increasing availability of such options. For example, index-based insurance is a relatively new product which triggers payment when weather indices, such as precipitation or temperature, cross a threshold. It aims to help customers such as farmers deal with production risks. Access to reinsurance may be a form of increasing the resiliency of cities.  Where there are failures in the private insurance market, the public sector can subsidize premiums. A study identified key equity issues for policy considerations:

 Transferring risk to the public purse does not reduce overall risk
 Governments can spread the cost of losses across time rather than space
 Governments can force home-owners in low risk areas to cross-subsidize the insurance premiums of those in high risk areas
 Cross-subsidization is increasingly difficult for private sector insurers operating in a competitive market
 Governments can tax people to pay for tomorrow's disaster.

Government-subsidized insurance, such as the U.S. National Flood Insurance Program, is criticized for providing a perverse incentive to develop properties in hazardous areas, thereby increasing overall risk.  It is also suggested that insurance can undermine other efforts to increase adaptation, for instance through property level protection and resilience. This behavioral effect may be countered with appropriate land-use policies that limit new construction where current or future climate risks are perceived and/or encourage the adoption of resilient building codes to mitigate potential damages.

Coordination mechanisms 
Coordination is any activity towards the achievement of goals shared with other actors, such as information-sharing or joint implementation of adaptation options, and it is important for effective use of resources, avoiding duplication, promoting consistency across government, and improving clarity for all actors. In the food production sector, adaptation projects financed through the UNFCCC often include coordination between subnational and national level governments, whilst coordination between community-level government and national level is less frequently documented.

Behavioural and cultural options 
Individuals and households play a central role in adaptation globally, with many examples documented particularly in the global south. Behavioural adaptation is change in the strategies, practices and actions that help to reduce risk, such as protecting homes from flooding, protecting crops from drought, and adopting different income earning activities. Behavioural change is also the most common form of adaptation.

Change in diets and food waste 
Food waste spoilage is increased from exposure to higher temperatures and humidity, or from extreme events such as flooding and contamination. This can happen at different points in the food supply chain and can be a risk to food security and nutrition. Adaptation measures can review the production, processing and other handling practices of suppliers. Examples include further sorting to separate damaged products, drying the product for better storage or improved packaging. Other behaviour change options for retailers and consumers include acceptance of less-than-perfect fruit and vegetable appearance, redistribution of food surplus and lowered prices on nearly expired food.

Dietary change options (in regions with excess consumption of calories) include replacing meat and dairy foods with a higher share of plant-based foods. These have both mitigation and adaptation benefits. Plant-based options have much lower energy and water requirements. Adaptation options can investigate those dietary patterns that are better adjusted to the regional, socioeconomic and cultural context. People's preferences for foods are strongly shaped by social–cultural norms. Supporting policies such as subsidies, taxes, and marketing can also be important for dietary choice.

Change in livelihood strategies 

There is increasing understanding of agricultural adaptation options including changing planting time, or changing to crops and livestock that are more adapted to climate conditions and presence of pests, breeding more resilient crops and selecting genetically modified crops (given new technological options). These aim at improving food security and nutrition.

Seasonal migration 

Seasonal migration or mobility includes traditional strategies such as pastoralism or seeking seasonal employment in urban centres, and is normally voluntary and economically motivated. Weather fluctuations and extremes can influence migration. Weather variability is thought to be an important contributor to declines in agricultural incomes and employment. Climate change has made these impacts more likely and migration, particularly rural to urban movement, is thought to have increased as a result. Migration, including seasonal migration, is seen as behavioural climate adaptation, but decisions are based on many other factors and it remains difficult to quantify the influence of climate change.

Nature-based options 

Nature-based solutions (NBS) work with nature and ecosystems to provide benefits to both societies and overall biodiversity. In the context of climate change, they provide adaptation and mitigation options that benefit and support wild species and habitats, often contributing to other sustainable development goals.

Nature-based solutions is an overarching term that includes actions also known as ecosystem-based adaptation. However NBS is not restricted to climate change, and is also often used to refer to climate change mitigation, so it is a less specific term. Both approaches share a requirement that benefits to people and nature are delivered simultaneously.

Supporting ecosystems and biodiversity 
Ecosystems adapt to global warming depending on their resilience to climatic changes. Humans can help adaptation in ecosystems for biodiversity. Possible responses include increasing connectivity between ecosystems so that species can migrate on their own to more favorable climate conditions and assisting their migration through human transport of plants or animals. Another example is using scientific research and development to help coral reefs survive climate change. Protection and restoration of natural and semi-natural areas also helps build resilience, making it easier for ecosystems to adapt.

Supporting people and societies 
Many of the actions that promote adaptation in ecosystems, also help humans adapt via ecosystem-based adaptation and nature-based solutions. For instance, restoration of natural fire regimes makes catastrophic fires less likely, and reduces the human exposure to this hazard. Giving rivers more space allows for storage of more water in the natural system, making floods in inhabited areas less likely. The provision of green spaces and tree planting creates shade for livestock. There is a trade-off between agricultural production and the restoration of ecosystems in some areas.

Options by type of impact

Flooding 

Flooding can be in the form of urban flooding or coastal flooding which is exacerbated by sea level rise. In some areas there are also risks of glacial lake outburst floods.

There are a wide variety of adaptation options for flooding: 
 Installing better flood defenses such as flood barriers, sea walls and increased pumping capacity
 Installing devices to prevent seawater from backflowing into storm drains
 Rainwater storage to deal with increased run-off from rainfall causing flooding  – reducing paved areas or changing to water-permeable pavements, adding water-buffering vegetation, adding underground storage tanks, subsidizing household rain barrels t
 Raising pumps at wastewater treatment plants
 Buying out homeowners in flood-prone areas
 Raising street level to prevent flooding
 Flooding could be prevented by using and protecting mangroves
 Glacial lakes in danger of outburst flooding can have their moraines replaced with concrete dams to provide protection (which may also provide hydroelectric power).

Dealing with more frequent drenching rains may required increasing the capacity of stormwater systems, and separating stormwater from blackwater, so that overflows in peak periods do not contaminate rivers. One example is the SMART Tunnel in Kuala Lumpur.

New York City produced a comprehensive report for its Rebuilding and Resiliency initiative after Hurricane Sandy. Its efforts include not only making buildings less prone to flooding, but taking steps to reduce the recurrence of specific problems encountered during and after the storm: weeks-long fuel shortages even in unaffected areas due to legal and transportation problems, flooded health care facilities, insurance premium increases, damage to electricity and steam generation in addition to distribution networks, and flooding of subway and roadway tunnels.

Sea level rise

Heat waves 

A 2020 study projects that regions inhabited by a third of the human population could become as hot as the hottest parts of the Sahara within 50 years without a change in patterns of population growth and without migration, unless greenhouse gas emissions are substantially reduced to a limit of 1.5 °C of warming. The most affected regions have little adaptive capacity as of 2020.

Cities are particularly affected by heat waves due to the urban heat island effect: Climate change is not the cause of urban heat islands but it is causing more frequent and more intense heat waves which in turn amplify the urban heat island effect in cities. Compact, dense urban development may increase the urban heat island effect, leading to higher temperatures and increased exposure.

Heat in cities can be reduced by tree cover and green space, which act as sources of shade and promote evaporative cooling. Other options include green roofs, passive daytime radiative cooling applications, and the use of lighter-colored surfaces and less absorptive building materials in urban areas, to reflect more sunlight and absorb less heat. City trees might have to be changed over to more heat tolerant tree varieties.

Methods for adapting to increased heat include:
 The use and development of air conditioning and cooling systems: Adding air conditioning in schools provides a cooler work place but results in additional greenhouse gas emissions unless solar energy is used.
Solar-energy passive cooling systems for houses and/or refrigeration.

Changed rainfall patterns in agriculture 

A significant effect of global climate change is the altering of global rainfall patterns, with certain effects on agriculture. Rainfed agriculture constitutes 80% of global agriculture. Many of the 852 million poor people in the world live in parts of Asia and Africa that depend on rainfall to cultivate food crops. Climate change will modify rainfall, evaporation, runoff, and soil moisture storage. Extended drought can cause the failure of small and marginal farms with resultant economic, political and social disruption, more so than this currently occurs.

Agriculture of any kind is strongly influenced by the availability of water. Changes in total seasonal precipitation or in its pattern of variability are both important. The occurrence of moisture stress during flowering, pollination, and grain-filling is harmful to most crops and particularly so to corn, soybeans, and wheat. Increased evaporation from the soil and accelerated transpiration in the plants themselves will cause moisture stress.

Adaptive ideas include:
 Taking advantage of global transportation systems to delivering surplus food to where it is needed (though this does not help subsistence farmers unless aid is given).
 Developing crop varieties with greater drought tolerance.
 Rainwater storage. For example, using small planting basins to 'harvest' water in Zimbabwe has been shown to boost maize yields, whether rainfall is abundant or scarce. And in Niger, they have led to three or fourfold increases in millet yields.
 Falling back from crops to wild edible fruits, roots and leaves. Promoting the growth of forests can provide these backup food supplies, and also provide watershed conservation, carbon sequestration, and aesthetic value.
Climate change can threaten food security and water security. Food systems can be adapted to enhance food security and to prevent future negative impacts from climate change.

More spending on irrigation 
The demand for water for irrigation is projected to rise in a warmer climate, bringing increased competition between agriculture—already the largest consumer of water resources in semi-arid regions—and urban as well as industrial users. Falling water tables and the resulting increase in the energy needed to pump water will make the practice of irrigation more expensive, particularly when with drier conditions more water will be required per acre. Other strategies will be needed to make the most efficient use of water resources. For example, the International Water Management Institute has suggested five strategies that could help Asia feed its growing population in light of climate change. These are: Modernizing existing irrigation schemes to suit modern methods of farming; supporting farmers' efforts to find their own water supplies, by tapping into groundwater in a sustainable way; Looking beyond conventional "Participatory Irrigation Management" schemes, by engaging the private sector; Expanding capacity and knowledge; Investing outside the irrigation sector.

Drought and desertification 

Reforestation is one of the ways to stop desertification fueled by anthropogenic climate change and non sustainable land use. One of the most important projects is the Great Green Wall that should stop the expansion of Sahara desert to the south. By 2018 only 15% of it is accomplished, but there are already many positive effects, which include: "Over 12 million acres (5 million hectares) of degraded land has been restored in Nigeria; roughly 30 million acres of drought-resistant trees have been planted across Senegal; and a whopping 37 million acres of land has been restored in Ethiopia – just to name a few of the states involved." "Many groundwater wells [were] refilled with drinking water, rural towns with additional food supplies, and new sources of work and income for villagers, thanks to the need for tree maintenance."

Migration pressures

Of humans 

Migration can be seen as adaptation: people may be able to generate more income, diversify livelihoods, and spread climate risk. This contrasts with two other frames around migration and environmental change: migration as a human rights issue and migration as a security issue. In the human right's frame, normative implications include developing protection frameworks for migrants, whereas increased border security may be an implication of framing migration as a national security issue. Sometimes these approaches are combined for the development of solutions (laws and policies) that aim to be both viable, taking national concerns into account, and in accordance with human rights. Furthermore, there may also be economic aspects of migration – high levels of migration and emigration of skilled workers – that decision-makers in both the – distant or nearby – host country and the country of origin may consider. Vice versa, climate change could also exacerbate economic insecurity or political instability as causes for migration beyond temperatures and extreme weather events.

Would-be migrants often need access to social and financial capital, such as support networks in the chosen destination and the funds or physical resources to be able to move. Migration is frequently the last adaptive response households will take when confronted with environmental factors that threaten their livelihoods, and mostly resorted to when other mechanisms to cope have proven unsuccessful.

Migration events are multi-causal, with the environment being just a factor amongst many. Many discussions around migration are based on projections, while relatively few use current migration data. Migration related to sudden events like hurricanes, heavy rains, floods, and landslides is often short-distance, involuntary, and temporary. Slow-impact events, such as droughts and slowly rising temperatures, have more mixed effects. People may lose the means to migrate, leading to a net decrease in migration. The migration that does take place is seen as voluntary and economically motivated.

Focusing on climate change as the issue may frame the debate around migration in terms of projections, causing the research to be speculative. Migration as tool for climate change adaptation is projected to be a more pressing issue in the decade to come. In Africa, specifically, migrant social networks can help to build social capital to increase the social resilience in the communities of origin and trigger innovations across regions by the transfer of knowledge, technology, remittances and other resources.

In Africa, Mozambique and Zimbabwe are clear examples of adaptation strategies because they have implemented relocation policies that have reduced the exposure of populations and migrants to disaster. Tools can be put in place that limit forced displacement after a disaster; promote employment programs, even if only temporary, for internally displaced people or establish funding plans to ensure their security; to minimize the vulnerability of populations from risk areas. This can limit the displacement caused by environmental shocks and better channel the positive spillovers (money transfers, experiences, etc.) from the migration to the origin countries/communities.

Relocation from the effects of climate change has been brought to light more and more over the years from the constant increasing effects of climate change in the world. Coastal homes in the U.S. are in danger from climate change, this is leading residents to relocate to areas that are less affected. Flooding in coastal areas and drought have been the main reasons for relocation.

Of ecosystems 
Assisted migration is the act of moving plants or animals to a different habitat. The destination habitat may or may not have once previously held the species; the only requirement is the destination habitat must provide the bioclimatic requirements to support the species. The goal of assisted migration is to remove the species from a threatening environment and give them a chance to survive and reproduce in an environment that does not pose an existential threat to the species.

In recent years, assisted migration has been presented as a potential solution to the climate change crisis that has changed environments faster than natural selection can adapt to. While assisted migration has the potential to allow species that have poor natural dispersal abilities to avoid extinction, it has also sparked intense debate over the possibility of the introduction of invasive species and diseases into previously healthy ecosystems. Despite these debates, scientists and land managers have already begun the process of assisted migration for certain species.

In the North American context, assisted migration is most often discussed in the context of the relocalization of the continent's forests. In the late 2000s and early 2010s, the Canadian provinces of Alberta and British Columbia modified their tree reseeding guidelines to account for the northward movement of forest's optimal ranges. British Columbia even gave the green light for the relocation of a single species, the Western Larch, 1000 km northward.

Risks by sectors 

Key sectors and systems impacted by climate change for which risks and adaptation options have been assessed are: ecosystems, water, food, cities, human health, communities and livelihoods.

Ecosystems 

Key risks to ecosystems from climate change include biodiversity loss, ecosystem structure change, increased tree mortality, increased wildfire, and ecosystem carbon losses. These risks are interconnected: for example, loss of species can increase the risks to ecosystem health. Wildfire is an increasing risk for people as well as to ecosystems in many parts of the world. Wildfires and increased pest infestations due to climate change caused much of the recent tree mortality in North America.  

Risks to seas and coastal areas include coral bleaching linked with ocean warming. This can change the composition of ecosystems. Coral bleaching and mortality also increases the risks of flooding on nearby shorelines and islands. Ocean acidification attributed to climate change is also a driver of change in coral reef ecosytems and other ecosystems such as rocky shores and kelp forests. 

Ecosystems can respond to climatic and other environmental pressures in different ways. Individual organisms can respond through growth, movement and other developmental processes. Species and populations can relocate or can genetically adapt. Human interventions can also build the resilience of ecosystems and help species adapt, for example protecting larger areas of semi-natural habitat and creating connectivity between parts of the landscape to support movement of species. 

Ecosystem-based adaptation actions, which provide benefits for both ecosystems and humans, include restoring coastal and river systems to reduce flood risk and improve water quality, creating more green areas in cities to reduce temperatures and reinstating natural fire regimes to reduce risk of severe wildfires. There are many approaches to reduce the risk of disease outbreaks such as building surveillance systems of pathogens affecting humans, wildlife and farm animals.

Health 

Climate change related risks to health include direct risks from extreme weather such as cold waves, storms, or prolonged high temperatures. There are also indirect risks such as mental health impacts of undernutrition or displacement caused by extreme weather. Similarly there are mental health risks from loss of access to green spaces, reduced air quality, or from anxiety about climate change itself. There are further risks from changes in conditions for transmission of infectious diseases, for example malaria and dengue are particularly climate-sensitive. 

Adapting to new or increased infectious disease risks could involve vector control approaches through  improved housing and better sanitation conditions for example through WASH services. It could also include insecticide-treated bed nets and indoor spraying and, for food-borne diseases, food processing and storage. 

Adaptation options for heat include expanding access to air conditioning and establishing heat action plans that include early warning systems for heatwaves. Other options are passive cooling systems to include shading and ventilation, which could be part of improved building and urban design and planning, green infrastructure or public cooling centres.

Adaptation options to respond to mental health impacts include increasing funding and access to mental healthcare, and incorporating mental health into climate resilience and disaster risk planning, and improving post-disaster support. Mental health also benefits from broader activities such as design of healthy natural spaces, education and cultural activities and it is also closely related to food security and nutrition.

Cities 

Rising temperatures and heatwaves is a key risk for cities. With warmer temperatures urban heat island effect is likely to get worse, and human health and productivity risks will be influenced by population growth and land use change in cities. Urban flooding is another key risk, especially in coastal settlements where flood risks are exacerbated by sea-level rise and storm surges. A further set of risks arise from reduced water availability. When supply cannot meet demand from expanding settlements, urban residents become exposed to water insecurity and climate impacts, especially during periods of lower rainfall. These key risks differ greatly between cities, and between different groups of people in the same city. 

Adaptation options for cities include flood control measures within and outside properties, urban drainage projects or nature-based solutions such as bioswales or other vegetated infrastructure and restoration and/or protection of mangroves along coastlines. Vegetation corridors, greenspace, wetlands and other green infrastructure can also reduce heat risks, as can building designs such as installing air conditioning, ‘cool roofs’ (i.e., with high-reflectance materials) or solar chimneys. Several institutional adaptations are particularly important for cities, for example legislation of building codes, zoning and land use measures.

Many cities have integrated city-wide adaptation strategies or plans that bring together its social and economic activities, civil authorities and infrastructure services. Such actions are more effective if they are implemented in partnership with local communities, national governments, research institutions, and the private and third sector.

Water 

Climate change is affecting the overall and seasonal availability of water across regions. Climate change is projected to increase the variability of rain and there will be impacts on water quality as well as quantity, for example floods can wash pollutants into water bodies and damage water infrastructure. In many places, particularly in the tropics and sub-tropics, there are longer dry spells and droughts, sometimes over consecutive years. These have contributed to drier soil conditions, lower groundwater tables and reduced or changed flows of rivers. There are risks to ecosystems, and across many water-using sectors of the economy. Agriculture is expected to be affected by changes in water availability, putting food security at risk. Irrigation has often contributed to groundwater depletion and changes in the water cycle. It can sometimes make a drought worse.

Some of the most popular adaptations in agriculture include choosing less water-intensive crops or drought and flood-resistant varieties. They also include shifting the timing of sowing and harvesting according to the start of the rainy season. There are also other technological options available for saving water. Water is also used for hydroelectric generation, for cooling of power plants, and in other industries such as mining. Adapting hydroelectric plant designs and control systems to operate with less water, or diversifying in energy generation with other renewables are effective options.

Livelihoods and communities 
Livelihoods and living conditions are affected by climate change in significant ways, such as through access to natural resources and ecosystems, land and other assets.  Access to basic infrastructure services such as water and sanitation, electricity, roads, telecommunications is another aspect of vulnerability of communities and livelihoods to climate change.

The biggest livelihood-related risks stem from losses of agricultural yields, impacts on human health and food security, destruction of homes, and loss of income. There are also risks to fish and livestock that livelihoods depend on.  Some communities and livelihoods also face risks of irreversible losses and challenges to development, as well as more complex disaster risks.

The consequences of climate change are the most severe for the poorest populations, who are disproportionately more exposed to hazards such as temperature extremes and droughts. They also usually have fewer resources and assets and less access to funding, support and political influence. There are other forms of disadvantage due to discrimination, gender inequalities and through lack of access to resources (e.g., those with disabilities or of minority groups).

Across livelihoods sectors for households and communities the most common adaptation responses are engineered and technological options such as traditional infrastructure to protect a specific land use, ecosystem approaches such as watershed restoration or climate-smart agriculture technologies. Adaptation requires public and private investment in various natural assets as well as institutions that prioritise the needs of communities, including the poorest.

Risks by region 
Regions for which risks and adaptation options have been assessed are: Africa, Asia, Australasia, Central and South America, Europe, North America and Small Islands.

Developing countries tend to be more vulnerable to climate change than developed countries. Based on then-current development trends (in 2001), it was predicted that few developing countries would have the capacity to efficiently adapt to climate change. Partly this was attributed to their low adaptive capacity and the high costs of adaptation in proportion to their GDP.

Examples:

 Africa: Africa's major economic sectors have been vulnerable to observed climate variability. This vulnerability was judged to have contributed to Africa's weak adaptive capacity, resulting in Africa having high vulnerability to future climate change. It was thought likely that projected sea-level rise would increase the socio-economic vulnerability of African coastal cities.
 Asia: Climate change can result in the degradation of permafrost in boreal Asia, worsening the vulnerability of climate-dependent sectors, and affecting the region's economy.
 Australia and New Zealand: In Australia and New Zealand, most human systems have considerable adaptive capacity. With medium confidence, some Indigenous communities were judged to have low adaptive capacity.
 Europe: The adaptation potential of socioeconomic systems in Europe was judged to be relatively high in 2001. This was attributed to Europe's high GNP, stable growth, stable population, and well-developed political, institutional, and technological support systems.

 Latin America: The adaptive capacity of socioeconomic systems in Latin America was very low, particularly in regard to extreme weather events, and that the region's vulnerability was high.
 Polar regions: within the Antarctic and Arctic, at localities where water was close to melting point, socioeconomic systems were judged to be particularly vulnerable to climate change. The Arctic would be extremely vulnerable to climate change. It was predicted in 2007 that there would be major ecological, sociological, and economic impacts in the region. 
 Small islands: It was found in 2007 that small islands were particularly vulnerable to climate change.

Costs

Economic costs 
The economic costs of adaptation to climate change will depend in large part on how much the climate changes: higher levels of warming lead to considerably higher costs. Globally, adaptation is likely to cost tens or hundreds of billions of dollars annually for the next several decades. The IPCC's most recent summary states that adaptation will cost "15 to 411 billion USD yr−1 for climate change impacts out to 2030, with the majority of estimates being well above 100 billion." Because these costs are considerably higher than the finance available, there is an 'adaptation gap', which is especially pressing in developing countries. This gap is widening and forms a major barrier to adaptation. 

More regional estimates are also available. For example, the Asian Development Bank has a series of studies on the Economics of Climate Change in the Asia-Pacific region. These studies provide cost analysis of both adaptation and mitigation measures. The WEAP (Water Evaluation And Planning system) assists water resources researchers and planners in assessing impacts of and adaptations to climate change. The United Nations Development Programme's Climate Change Adaptation Portal includes studies on climate change adaptation in Africa, Europe and Central Asia, and Asia and the Pacific.

Cost benefit analysis 
As of 2007 there was still a lack of comprehensive, global cost and benefit estimates for adaptation. Since then, an extensive research literature has emerged, though studies generally focus on adaptation in developing countries or within a sector. This means that for many specific adaptation options in specific contexts, it is clear that the investment will be lower than the avoided damages, but global estimates have considerable uncertainty.

International finance 

The United Nations Framework Convention on Climate Change, under Article 11, incorporates a financial mechanism to developing country parties to support them with adaptation.  Until 2009, three funds existed under the UNFCCC financial mechanism. The Special Climate Change Fund (SCCF) and the Least Developed Countries Fund (LDCF) are administered by the Global Environmental Facility. The Adaptation Fund was established a result of negotiations during COP15 and COP16 and is administered by its own Secretariat. Initially, when the Kyoto Protocol was in operation, the Adaptation Fund was financed by a 2% levy on the Clean Development Mechanism (CDM).

At the 2009 Copenhagen Summit, nations committed to the goal of sending $100 billion per year to developing countries for climate change mitigation and adaptation by 2020. The Green Climate Fund was created in 2010 as one of the channels for mobilizing this climate finance. At the 2015 Paris conference, it was clarified that the $100 billion per year should involve a balanced split between mitigation and adaptation. , the promised $100 billion per year had not been fully delivered, and most developing country finance was still targeted towards mitigation, with adaptation only receiving a 21% share of the public finance provided in 2020.

Global adaptation financing from multilateral development banks exceeded €19 billion in 2021. This implies a rising trend in the financing of adaptation. Multilateral banks made a commitment to increase adaptation financing, particularly for low-income nations, small island developing states, and underprivileged people, in a joint declaration on climate change at COP27. The European Investment Bank, who usually contributes up to 50% for a project, have said that they will raise investment to 75% for projects that are predominantly driven by climate adaptation.

Additionality 
A key and defining feature of international adaptation finance is its premise on the concept of additionality. This reflects the linkages between adaptation finance and other levels of development aid. Many developed countries already provide international aid assistance to developing countries to address challenges such as  poverty, malnutrition, food insecurity, availability of drinking water, indebtedness, illiteracy, unemployment, local resource conflicts, and lower technological development. Climate change threatens to exacerbate or stall progress on fixing some of these pre-existing problems, and creates new problems. To avoid existing aid being redirected, additionality refers to the extra costs of adaptation.

The four main definitions of additionality are:

 Climate finance classified as aid, but additional to (over and above) the Millennium Development Goals;
 Increase on previous year's Official Development Assistance (ODA) spent on climate change mitigation;
 Rising ODA levels that include climate change finance but where it is limited to a specified percentage; and
 Increase in climate finance not connected to ODA.

A criticism of additionality is that it encourages business as usual that does not account for the future risks of climate change. Some advocates have thus proposed integrating climate change adaptation into poverty reduction programs.

From 2010 to 2020, Denmark increased its global warming adaptation aid 33%, from 0.09% of GDP to 0.12% of GDP, but not by additionality. Instead, the aid was subtracted from other foreign assistance funds. Politiken wrote: "Climate assistance is taken from the poorest."

Challenges

Differing time scales

Adaptation can occur in anticipation of change (anticipatory adaptation), or be a response to those changes (reactive adaptation). For example, artificial snow-making in the European Alps responds to current climate trends, whereas construction of the Confederation Bridge in Canada at a higher elevation takes into account the effect of future sea-level rise on ship clearance under the bridge.

Additionally, effective adaptive policy can be difficult to implement because policymakers are rewarded more for enacting short-term change, rather than long-term planning. Since the impacts of climate change are generally not seen in the short term, policymakers have less incentive to act. Furthermore, climate change is occurring on a global scale, which requires a global framework for adapting to and combating climate change. The vast majority of climate change adaptation and mitigation policies are being implemented on a more local scale because different regions must adapt differently and because national and global policies are often more challenging to enact.

Maladaptation 
Much adaptation takes place in relation to short-term climate variability, however this may cause maladaptation to longer-term climatic trends. For example, the expansion of irrigation in Egypt into the Western Sinai desert after a period of higher river flows is a maladaptation when viewed in relation to the longer term projections of drying in the region. Adaptations at one scale can also create externalities at another by reducing the adaptive capacity of other actors. This is often the case when broad assessments of the costs and benefits of adaptation are examined at smaller scales and it is possible to see that whilst the adaptation may benefit some actors, it has a negative effect on others. Development interventions to increase adaptive capacity have tended not to result in increased agency for local people. This should play a more prominent part in future intervention planning because agency is a central factor in all other aspects of adaptive capacity.

Limits to adaptation

People have always adapted to climatic changes and some community coping strategies already exist, for example changing sowing times or adopting new water-saving techniques. Traditional knowledge and coping strategies must be maintained and strengthened, otherwise adaptive capacity may be weakened as local knowledge of the environment is lost. Strengthening these local techniques and building upon them also makes it more likely that adaptation strategies will be adopted, as it creates more community ownership and involvement in the process.  In many cases this will not be enough to adapt to new conditions which are outside the range of those previously experienced, and new techniques will be needed. The incremental adaptations which have been implemented become insufficient as the vulnerabilities and risks of climate change increase, this causes a need for transformational adaptations which are much larger and costlier. Current development efforts are increasingly focusing on community-based climate change adaptation, seeking to enhance local knowledge, participation and ownership of adaptation strategies.

Incentivising private investment in adaptation 
Climate change adaptation is a much more complex investment area than mitigation, mainly because of the lack of a well-defined income stream or business case with an attractive return on investment on projects. There are several rather specific challenges for private investment: 

 adaptation is often needed in non-market sectors or is focused on public goods that benefit many (therefore there is a shortage of projects that are attractive to the private sector); 
 there is a mismatch between the timing of the investment where it is needed in the short-term and the benefits, which for adaptation are generally in the medium- or long-term (future returns are less attractive to investors than short-term returns); 
 there is a lack of information about investment opportunities, especially regarding uncertainties associated with future impacts and benefits (which are key considerations when returns may accrue over longer timeframes); 
 there are also gaps in human resources and capacities to design adaptation projects and understand financial implications of legal, economic and regulatory frameworks (which are often less developed).

However, there is considerable innovation in this area, increasing the potential for private sector finance to play a larger role in closing the adaptation finance gap. Economists state that climate adaptation initiatives should be an urgent priority for business investment.

Trade-offs with mitigation 
Trade-offs between adaptation and mitigation may occur when climate-relevant actions point in different directions. For instance, compact urban development may lead to reduced transport and building greenhouse gas emissions. On the other hand, it may increase the urban heat island effect, leading to higher temperatures and increasing exposure, making adaptation more challenging.

Planning and implementation

By country and city 

A 2020 United Nations report found that while 72% of countries had a high level adaptation instrument – such as a plan, policy or strategy – relatively few had progressed to the tangible implementation of projects. At least not to the point where the climate risk their populations are exposed to had been significantly reduced.

A survey of 812 global cities found that while 93% reported they are at risk from climate change, 43% did not have an adaptation plan in 2021, and 41% of cities had not carried out a climate risk and vulnerability assessment.

Global goals 
Sustainable Development Goal 13, which was set in 2015, aims to strengthen countries' resilience and adaptive capacities to climate-related issues. This adjustment includes many areas such as infrastructure, agriculture and education. The Paris Agreement includes several provisions for adaptation. It seeks to promote the idea of global responsibility, improve communication via the adaptation component of the Nationally Determined Contributions, and includes an agreement that developed countries should provide some financial support and technology transfer to promote adaptation in more vulnerable countries.

The United Nations estimates for Africa, considering population growth, yearly funding of $1.3 trillion would be needed to achieve the Sustainable Development Goals in Africa. The International Monetary Fund also estimates that $50 billion may be needed only to cover the expenses of climate adaptation.

See also

Adaptation in Africa
Green bond
Climate change adaptation strategies on the German coast
Climate finance
Climate justice
Climate Vulnerability Monitor

References

External links
 The Intergovernmental Panel on Climate Change (IPCC) Working Group II assesses the scientific literature on adaptation: Working Group II — IPCC
 The weADAPT platform encourages the sharing of experiences from adaptation projects to accelerate learning and climate action.

 
Adaptation
Animal ecology
Plant ecology
Climate change policy
National security